is a Japanese film director known for starting the Sasori / Female Prisoner Scorpion series of 1970s exploitation films starring Meiko Kaji. Itō worked for Toei Company for most of his career. In 1972, he won a Directors Guild of Japan New Directors Citation for his first film, Female Prisoner #701: Scorpion.

He won Picture of the Year at the Japanese Academy Awards in 1985 with his film Gray Sunset, a story of a man suffering from Alzheimer's disease. This thus became Japan's entry for the Academy Award for Best Foreign Language Film instead of Akira Kurosawa's Ran, which caused a slight uproar in Western media as many critics thought Ran had a real chance of winning whereas Gray Sunset was not even shortlisted. (Galbraith)

In 1995, he directed Lupin III: Farewell to Nostradamus. In 1998, he directed the World War II drama Pride: The Fateful Moment, presenting a sympathetic view of Hideki Tōjō on trial at the International Military Tribunal for the Far East, attracting accusations of revisionism.

Selected filmography
Female Prisoner #701: Scorpion (1972) (女囚７０１号 さそり)
Female Prisoner Scorpion: Jailhouse 41 (1972) (女囚さそり 第４１雑居房)
Female Prisoner Scorpion: Beast Stable (1973) (女囚さそり けもの部屋)
Inugami no tatari (1977) (犬神の悪霊)
To Trap a Kidnapper (1982) (誘拐報道)
Hakujasho (1983) (白蛇抄)
Gray Sunset (1985) (花いちもんめ)
Labyrinth of Flower Garden (1988) (花園の迷宮)
Lupin III: Farewell to Nostradamus (1995) (ルパン三世 くたばれ！ノストラダムス)
Pride: The Fateful Moment (1998) (プライド 運命の瞬間)
Independence of Japan (2020)

Notes

References
Galbraith, Stuart, IV. The Emperor and the Wolf: The Lives and Films of Akira Kurosawa and Toshiro Mifune. Faber & Faber, 2002. 

JMDb Listing (Japanese)

External links

1932 births
Japanese film directors
Pink film directors
Living people